The Big River is a river in the Tasman District of the South Island of New Zealand. It rises on the slopes of Mount White, elevation  in the Wakamarama Range. It flows northwest then north to the Tasman Sea.

See also
List of rivers of New Zealand

References
Land Information New Zealand - Search for Place Names
 Topographic map

Rivers of the Tasman District
Rivers of New Zealand